Otuziki (also, Verkhniy Otuziki) is a village and municipality in the Imishli Rayon of Azerbaijan.  It has a population of 1,399.

References 

Populated places in Imishli District